BMS-641988 is a nonsteroidal antiandrogen which was developed by Bristol-Myers Squibb for the treatment of prostate cancer but was never marketed. It acts as a potent competitive antagonist of the androgen receptor (AR) (Ki = 10 nM;  = 56 nM). The drug was found to have 20-fold higher affinity for the AR than bicalutamide in MDA-MB-453 cells, and showed 3- to 7-fold the antiandrogenic activity of bicalutamide in vitro. It may have some weak partial agonist activity at the androgen receptor. BMS-641988 is transformed by CYP3A4 into BMS-570511, and this metabolite is then reduced to BMS-501949 by cytosolic reductases. All three compounds show similar antiandrogenic activity. In addition to its antiandrogenic activity, BMS-641988 shows activity as a negative allosteric modulator of the GABAA receptor, and can produce seizures in animals at sufficiently high doses. It also shows some drug-induced QT prolongation. BMS-641988 reached phase I clinical trials prior to the discontinuation of its development. The clinical development of BMS-641988 was terminated due to the occurrence of a seizure in a patient during a phase I study.

References

External links
 BMS-641988 - AdisInsight

Abandoned drugs
GABAA receptor negative allosteric modulators
Hormonal antineoplastic drugs
Nitriles
Nonsteroidal antiandrogens
Prostate cancer
Sulfonamides
Trifluoromethyl compounds
Imides